The Boulet Brothers' Dragula is an American reality competition television series produced by Boulet Brothers Productions, hosted by the Boulet Brothers. The series originally aired on YouTube and has aired on Netflix in the United States, OUTtv in Canada, and Amazon Prime in the United Kingdom and Australia. Starting with season 4, the series moved to Shudder in all territories. The series will become a Shudder exclusive, with all seasons being hosted on the platform.

The series is created and hosted by the Boulet Brothers, who challenge a different set of eleven drag artists from around the world to compete in an underground style drag competition each season. The artists compete for the chance to win a cash prize and the crown of "Dragula - the World’s Next Drag Supermonster". The show celebrates underground and alternative drag art, and bases each episode's challenges on the four principles of the show - "Drag", "Filth", "Horror" and "Glamour".

Competitors on the show are tasked week to week in a variety of challenges ranging from costume creation, special-effects makeup, live performance and acting abilities. Each episode a winner is chosen, and the contestants who end up on the bottom must face extreme "extermination challenges" which test them physically and psychologically to prove they have the punk spirit required by the judges to remain in the competition.

History

The Boulet Brothers Dragula is created and produced by the Boulet Brothers, and their production company Boulet Brothers Productions. The reality show is loosely based on their club event and nightlife pageant of the same name.

The first season of The Boulet Brothers Dragula premiered on October 31, 2016 and aired as a seven episode pilot series on the YouTube channel Hey Qween!. Later that year, the show was picked up by Canadian network OutTV who ordered a full remastered and expanded version of Season 1, as well as a full second season of the show.

Season 2 premiered on October 31, 2017 and aired on Amazon Prime and WOW Presents in the United States. The season aired on Amazon Prime in the United Kingdom, OUTtv in Canada and SBS Viceland in Australia.

The series' third season premiered on Amazon Prime on August 27, 2019. Dragula became the first American reality television competition to feature a drag king after Landon Cider appeared as a contestant in Season 3. Beginning October 31, 2019, seasons 2 and 3 of the series moved to the American streaming service Netflix.

On October 20, Dragula had a special episode called "Dragula: Resurrection", where the Boulet Brother's brought back seven past contestants to compete for a spot on season 4. This season had streamed on Shudder, and the winner was Saint from the third season of Dragula.

On December 7, 2021 Shudder renewed the series for a fifth season.

On September 12, 2022 it was announced that an all-stars season titled Dragula: Titans would premiere on Shudder on October 25, 2022. The cast was announced on September 26, 2022 and features 10 contestants returning from the first four seasons of the main series: Abhora (Season 2), Astrud Aurelia (Season 4), Erika Klash (Season 2), Evah Destruction (Season 3), HoSo Terra Toma (Season 4), Kendra Onixxx (Season 2), Koco Caine (Season 4), Melissa Befierce (Season 1), Victoria Black (Season 2), and Yovska (Season 3). Kendra Onixxx and Victoria Black had also previously competed on the special "Dragula: Resurrection".

Format 
Each episode opens with a scripted scene starring the Boulet Brothers that introduces the episode’s theme and challenge. The rest of the episode is filmed in a reality TV documentary format. The competitors are issued that week’s challenge, and must work among each other, work out their interpersonal issues and create their looks and performances for that week.

Both the competition and the show's scripted cinematic segments are noted for drawing inspiration from the horror genre. The show's influences include films ranging from "Mad Max and Little Shop of Horrors, to folk horror and beach party films."

Floor show 
Each episode features a main “Floor Show” where each of the competitors display their looks and performance on the main stage. The performances and looks are judged, and one competitor is chosen the winner while the two or more lowest scoring competitors are put up for “extermination”.

Extermination challenges 
The show features "Extermination Challenges", fear-based physical and psychological tests created to push the competitors to “face their fears” in order to remain on the show. Past extermination challenges have included being buried alive in a coffin, being pierced with gauged needles, skydiving, eating cow intestines, and surviving an evening in an extreme haunted house. The competitor who fails the extermination challenge is "killed off" by the Boulet Brother's in a scripted scene at the end of each episode.

Judges 
The Boulet Brothers serve as the primary judges on the show, and are the only regular judges on the panel. Each episode they are joined by a rotating cast of celebrity musicians, directors, writers and horror alumni including Henry Rollins, Milly Shapiro, Amanda Lepore, Bonnie Aarons, Felissa Rose, Danielle Harris, Rachel True, and Cig Nuetron. American horror film director Darren Stein and drag legend Peaches Christ are the only judges to have appeared in all four seasons of the show.

Series overview

Season 1 (2016–17)

Season 2 (2017–18)

Season 3 (2019)

Season 4 (2021)

Spin-off series overview

Notes:

The Boulet Brothers' Dragula: Resurrection
A spin-off film titled The Boulet Brothers' Dragula: Resurrection was released on AMC Networks' Shudder on October 20, 2020. The film was written, co-directed, and produced by the Boulet Brothers. Digital Spy described it as "part-horror movie, part-documentary and part-reality competition". The film featured a competition between contestants from previous seasons of Dragula, with the winner returning for the fourth season of Dragula. The film's soundtrack includes music from Orville Peck and Kim Petras.

Contestants
Legend:

Notes:

The Boulet Brothers' Dragula: Titans (2022)

Reception
Since its original online airing, Dragula has received positive reviews, and was dubbed “Required Horror Viewing” by Fangoria. The series has had consistently high viewership, and its fourth season was the most watched program on Shudder.

The show treats drag as a form of outsider art, and encourages different styles of drag which could be labelled "weird" or unconventional. Carly Maga of horror magazine Rue Morgue identified the rising popularity of Dragula as having a positive impact on drag as a whole, saying that the "rise of horror drag is keeping the art form true to its nonconformist origins."

Vice writer Jeff Leavell reviewed the series as being "loud, weird" and that it "pisses on heteronormativity". He also said that Dragula should not be thought of as "just a show about drag queens who love grotesque, hardcore queer performance art", and that "in its own way, it's encouraging us to stand united, whether you're a supermonster or not".

Adam Zee of Wussy Magazine praised the series for its philosophy towards drag, exemplified by the Boulet Brothers' statement that "We are not here to judge your drag. Drag is art and art is subjective." Zee commented that:"While it seems simple, this simple idea is what truly distinguishes The Boulet Brother's’ Dragula from RuPaul’s Drag Race and most other reality competitions. The Boulets place significant value in the artistic merit and anti-establishment traditions of drag. They have directed their focus on drag artistry that is unpredictable, outlandish and disturbing rather than getting queens to conform to show business standards. The only molds contestants must fit into are challenge-based or the loose overarching tenets of Filth, Glamour and Horror. Even then, 2 out of 3 is usually good enough to get by."Dragula has also received favorable coverage for its inclusion of all genders and types of drag performers in the competition. It was the first televised U.S. show to feature a drag king and an AFAB drag artist. The film Dragula Resurrection was praised for foregrounding trans narratives in a "sensitive, understated" manner.

See also

 List of programs broadcast by OUTtv
 List of Shudder original programming
 List of reality television programs with LGBT cast members

References

Further reading

External links
 
 
 
 
 
 

2010s American LGBT-related television series
2010s Canadian LGBT-related television series
2010s Canadian reality television series
2010s LGBT-related reality television series
2016 Canadian television series debuts
American LGBT-related web series
Canadian LGBT-related web series
Drag (clothing) television shows
OutTV (Canadian TV channel) original programming
Television series by World of Wonder (company)
The Boulet Brothers' Dragula
American LGBT-related reality television series
Canadian LGBT-related reality television series
Reality competition television series
Shudder (streaming service) original programming